Geoff Emery (born 4 August 1969 in Melbourne) is a racing driver from Australia. He is a three-time winner of the Australian GT Championship, and competed in the 2010 Bathurst 1000.

Career results

Complete Bathurst 1000 results

‡Salmon was the entered driver, but his place was taken by Zukanovic before the race.

Bathurst 12 Hours results

References

External links
 Driver Database

Australian racing drivers
1969 births
Living people
Australian Endurance Championship drivers